The King's Bridge is a historic covered bridge in Middlecreek Township, Somerset County, Pennsylvania.  It was built in 1802, and is a  Burr truss bridge, with an asbestos covered gable roof. The bridge crosses Laurel Hill Creek.  It is one of 10 covered bridges in Somerset County.

It was added to the National Register of Historic Places in 1980.

See also
List of bridges documented by the Historic American Engineering Record in Pennsylvania

References

External links

Covered bridges in Somerset County, Pennsylvania
Covered bridges on the National Register of Historic Places in Pennsylvania
Bridges completed in 1806
Bridges in Somerset County, Pennsylvania
Historic American Engineering Record in Pennsylvania
National Register of Historic Places in Somerset County, Pennsylvania
Road bridges on the National Register of Historic Places in Pennsylvania
Wooden bridges in Pennsylvania
Burr Truss bridges in the United States